Charles Gould Morton (January 15, 1861 – July 18, 1933) was an American major general during World War I.

Early life
Charles Gould Morton was born on January 15, 1861, to Allen and Mary Morton in Cumberland, Maine. He attended the United States Military Academy (USMA) at West Point, New York, and graduated with the class of 1883. Several of his fellow classmates would go on to become general officers in their careers, such as Charles W. Kennedy, George H. Cameron, Harry C. Hale, George W. Read, John W. Heard, Ira A. Haynes, Samson L. Faison, William C. Langfitt, Robert D. Walsh, Omar Bundy, Tyree R. Rivers, John W. Ruckman, Isaac Littell and Clarence R. Edwards.

Military career

Morton accepted a commission as an infantry officer and served on the frontier until 1888. From 1889 to 1890, Morton was a Professor of Military Science at the Florida Agricultural College.

For most of his military career, Morton served with the 6th Infantry Regiment. Morton served with the regiment in the Philippines from January 1900 to June 1902 and August 1905 to June 1907. He graduated from the United States Army War College in June 1905.

During World War I, he commanded the 29th Division. Morton then commanded the Ninth Corps Area, which had its headquarters at the Presidio of San Francisco. He retired on January 15, 1925, upon reaching the mandatory retirement age of 64.

Awards
Morton received the Army Distinguished Service Medal for his service during World War I, the citation for which reads:

Morton also received the Croix de Guerre with two palms and the title of Commander of the Legion of Honor.

Personal life
Morton married Ida Hastings on October 15, 1885. She died in 1921, and Morton subsequently married Eleanor Moorhead Huff on June 14, 1922. He and his second wife lived in Saratoga, California, after his retirement from active duty.

Death and legacy
Morton died on July 18, 1933, in San Francisco, California from a tetanus infection after suffering a burn in a firecracker accident on July 4. He was cremated and interred at Arlington National Cemetery beside his first wife and her parents on July 27, 1933.

The transport ship  was named in his honor and saw service in World War II and the Korean War.

Bibliography

References

External links

1861 births
1933 deaths
People from Cumberland, Maine
United States Military Academy alumni
Military personnel from Maine
United States Army Infantry Branch personnel
University of Florida faculty
American military personnel of the Philippine–American War
United States Army War College alumni
United States Army generals of World War I
Recipients of the Distinguished Service Medal (US Army)
United States Army generals
People from Saratoga, California
Deaths from tetanus
Burials at Arlington National Cemetery